Kanae Ikehata is a Japanese female Foil fencer. She competed at the 2012 Summer Olympics in the individual event and the team event. In the individual event she was eliminated in the quarterfinals by Nam Hyun-Hee. In the team event the Japanese team was eliminated in the second round by Russia.

References

1982 births
Living people
Japanese female foil fencers
Olympic fencers of Japan
Fencers at the 2012 Summer Olympics
Asian Games medalists in fencing
Fencers at the 2010 Asian Games
Asian Games silver medalists for Japan
Medalists at the 2010 Asian Games
Universiade medalists in fencing
Universiade bronze medalists for Japan
People from Iida, Nagano
Medalists at the 2005 Summer Universiade